Baia is a small town in Bengo, Angola. It is located on the outskirts of the Angolan capital Luanda.

Transport 

It is served by a station on the Luanda Railway.

In 2003, it was proposed to duplicate the railway line from Bungo, Angola.

See also 

 Railway stations in Angola

References 

Populated places in Bengo Province